Cody Thomas Blackbird is a musician, best known for playing the Native American flute. With the Cody Blackbird Band, composed of himself, his brother Caleb, Xavier Torres and Lewis Schenk, Blackbird released All In in 2016.

References 

Living people
Year of birth missing (living people)